The 12317 / 12318 Akal Takht Express is an Indian Railways Express train connecting eastern Indian city of Kolkata with northern Indian city of Amritsar.

Background
Originally starting from Sealdah, its terminus got changed to Kolkata in 2014. It has sleeper, third AC, second AC, first AC, and unreserved types of coaches along with 2 EOG for power.
This train has modern LHB coach, however, pantry car facility is not available with this train but on-board catering and e-catering is available.

Route & halts

Coach composition

The train has standard LHB rakes with max speed of 130 km/h. The train consists of 22 coaches:

 1 AC I cum AC II Tier
 1 AC II Tier
 6 AC III Tier
 10 Sleeper coaches
 2 General
 2 EOG

Traction 

As the route is fully electrified, train is hauled by an Howrah / Sealdah-based WAP-7 electric locomotive from Kolkata to Amritsar, and vice versa.

Rake sharing

The train sharing its rake with 12315/12316 Ananya Express.

References

Transport in Kolkata
Transport in Amritsar
Rail transport in Punjab, India
Rail transport in West Bengal
Rail transport in Jharkhand
Rail transport in Uttar Pradesh
Rail transport in Bihar
Rail transport in Haryana
Railway services introduced in 2010
Express trains in India
Named passenger trains of India